Mississauga City Centre is the downtown of Mississauga, Ontario, Canada. The downtown district is located generally at the intersection of Hurontario Street and Burnhamthorpe Road, centred around Square One Shopping Centre.

Design and layout

Mississauga is a suburban city, restructured from the predominantly rural Toronto Township, and as a result the core is a modern and fully planned greenfield development, rather than a traditional city downtown which grew organically over a long period of time. As such, it's boundaries are sharp and there is no transitional inner city between it and the surrounding suburban areas, some of which are older than the city centre itself.

Originally there was an octagonal ring road encircling Square One Shopping Centre, but later changes to the street pattern as development progressed resulted in parts of it being incorporated into the present City Centre Drive and Duke of York Boulevard or being replaced by Square One Drive.

The early developments in the city centre were mostly office buildings set in the middle of parking lots or condominiums constructed in tower in the park settings, as was the typical before the new urbanism principle was applied in the city centre planning area. Two of these office developments (including Mississauga's second Civic Centre) have since been demolished and have been or are being replaced with new projects.

History
 
The intersection of Hurontario Street and Burnhamthorpe Road was once the site of a rural hamlet named Payne's Corners. Prior to 1973, the area was predominantly agricultural. In the 1950s, developer Bruce McLaughlin began buying up farms in the area as he envisioned the-then mostly rural Toronto Township, as Mississauga was then known, becoming a future major city (at the time, suburban growth was already spilling over from Metropolitan Toronto) with a new urban core. To get his envisioned core started, he proposed building Square One in 1969. The new core was given an additional boost that year after a fire badly damaged the newly incorporated Town of Mississauga's municipal offices in the nearby community of Cooksville, prompting the municipality to move its offices (a move that was already being contemplated) to a new building constructed on a plot of land in the area exchanged with McLaughlin for the old Cooksville property.

In 1973, Square One opened, and it provided the catalyst for the development of the new city centre. Mississauga's first mayor, Martin Dobkin, as well as then-future mayor Hazel McCallion, wanted the city centre developed in Cooksville, the municipality's most central historic community, by intensification, but the popularity of the mall (as well as the location of the civic centre), enticed developers, such as Ignat Kaneff and Harold Shipp, to construct condominium and office projects around it, such as the Mississauga Executive Centre in 1976. In 1986, Shipp worked with the Mathews Corporation to open a Novotel hotel, which is today still the only hotel in the city centre.

When McLaughlin's corporation ran into financial difficulties in the late 1970s, Mayor Hazel McCallion proposed that an iconic new city hall with a large civic square be built. Groundbreaking took place in 1984 for the new facility, and it was opened in July 1987, with the Duke and Duchess of York being present at the opening ceremonies.

Buildings

Mississauga City Centre today has a number of highrise buildings and, largely due the Greater Toronto Area condo boom, has several more under construction and planned. Most of this newer growth has occurred west of City Hall, centred along Confederation Parkway, in an area that was the last sector to develop but which has now become the most densely populated area in the core, and that most resembles a stereotypical downtown streetscape.

One of the earliest built and most prominent buildings in the city centre include the aforementioned City Hall. As of 2021, the tallest is the residential Absolute World complex, located at the northeast corner of Burnhamthorpe Road and Hurontario Street. It consists of six towers, with its iconic main twin towers, nicknamed "the Marilyn Monroe" because of their curvy shape, standing 50 and 56 storeys. Other residential towers include PSV at Parkside Village, One Park Tower, and Chicago.

Under construction

Projects currently under construction include the multi-tower M City Condominiums (the main tower which will become Mississauga's tallest building at 62 storeys), Avia, and Exchange District Condos.

Institutions

Mississauga's largest public library, the Central Library, is located at 301 Burnhamthorpe Road West at the corner of Living Arts Drive. The city's YMCA is located at 325 Burnhamthorpe West, across the street from the Central Library. Living Arts Centre, a performing arts venue, opened in 1997. A satellite campus of Sheridan College, the Hazel McCallion Campus, is also located in the city centre at 4180 Duke of York Boulevard at Rathburn Road. Its first phase opened in 2011.

Transportation

Public transit

Mississauga City Centre is well-served by MiWay and GO Transit. The City Centre Transit Terminal is the city's main transit terminal and hosts 21 MiWay bus routes and one Brampton Transit–operated bus rapid transit (named Züm) route. GO Transit buses serve the nearby Square One Bus Terminal. The under-construction Hurontario LRT will serve the terminal via a spur along Rathburn Road.

Roads

Two key streets in the city centre are Hurontario Street and Burnhamthorpe Road. There are also other secondary arterials such as Rathburn Road, Confederation Parkway, and City Centre Drive. Highway 403 forms the northern boundary of the city centre and provides access to it from interchanges at Hurontario Street and Mavis Road, with the latter accessed via Centre View Drive, which runs alongside the freeway and branches off eastbound from the interchange.

References 

Central business districts in Canada
Neighbourhoods in Mississauga